King Faisal Street is a main street in central Aleppo, Syria. Located to the northwest of the Saadallah Al-Jabiri Square connecting the Aleppo Public Park with Al-Sabil Park. The street ends up with Shihan Square to the north of the city centre.

History
King Faisal street was founded in 1919, to connect al-Jamiliyah district at the city centre with al-Sabil park, through the Syriac district. It was named in the honour of Faisal I the king of Syria. 

In 1964, the Saint Matilda Melkite Greek church was opened on the street. Later in 1994, Al-Rahman mosque was built on the street, adjacent to al-Sabil park.

The street served as a highway until 2008 when the separating green row of trees was removed and the street was turned to a single-way avenue.

Gallery

References

Aleppo
Streets in Syria